Jacob Raphael Cohen (1738 – September 9, 1811) was a rabbi in England, Canada, and the United States.

Biography 
Jacob Raphael Cohen served as rabbi of Congregation Mikveh Israel in Philadelphia from 1784 until his death in 1811. In celebration of Pennsylvania's ratification of the United States Constitution on July 4, 1788, Cohen walked arm-in-arm with two ministers, one of whom was Reverend William White of Christ Church, dean of the clergy of Philadelphia. The records of his marriages, deaths, and circumcisions are an important source of data on early American Jewish ritual and history.

References

Hazzans
Canadian Orthodox rabbis
American Jews
English Jews
1738 births
1811 deaths
19th-century Canadian Jews